Mary Lou Fallis  (born April 22, 1948) is a Canadian opera singer. She performs both serious opera roles and comedic shows as the character Primadonna, a satirical take on popular stereotypes of opera divas. Her recordings are listed on her personal web site.

Born in Toronto, Ontario, Fallis began her education as a singer with her grandmother, Jennie Bouck. She is a graduate of the University of Toronto, and teaches at the University of Western Ontario. She was a judge on the reality series Bathroom Divas: So You Want To Be An Opera Star? in 2006.

In 2011, she was made a Member of the Order of Canada "for her contributions, as a performer and broadcaster, in making classical music more accessible to Canadians across the country."
She also won an ACTRA award.

References

1948 births
Living people
Canadian comedy musicians
Canadian sopranos
Canadian women comedians
Comedians from Toronto
Members of the Order of Canada
Musicians from Toronto
University of Toronto alumni
Academic staff of the University of Western Ontario
Participants in Canadian reality television series
20th-century Canadian women opera singers
21st-century Canadian women opera singers